Sanatoga is a community and census-designated place (CDP) in Lower Pottsgrove Township, Montgomery County, Pennsylvania, United States. It is immediately east of the borough of Pottstown on U.S. Route 422.  The population was 8,378 at the 2010 census.

Geography
Sanatoga is located at  (40.250252, -75.588933).

Sanatoga is adjacent to U.S. Route 422.

Demographics

At the 2000 census there were 7,734 people, 2,734 households, and 2,058 families living in the CDP. The population density was 2,265.7 people per square mile (875.7/km2). There were 2,811 housing units at an average density of 823.5/sq mi (318.3/km2).  The racial makeup of the CDP was 85.60% White, 11.46% African American, 0.14% Native American, 0.92% Asian, 0.04% Pacific Islander, 0.32% from other races, and 1.53% from two or more races. Hispanic or Latino of any race were 1.51%.

There were 2,734 households, 42.8% had children under the age of 18 living with them, 57.9% were married couples living together, 13.8% had a female householder with no husband present, and 24.7% were non-families. 20.2% of households were made up of individuals, and 8.2% were one person aged 65 or older. The average household size was 2.76 and the average family size was 3.20.

The age distribution was 30.8% under the age of 18, 6.4% from 18 to 24, 32.9% from 25 to 44, 18.9% from 45 to 64, and 11.0% 65 or older. The median age was 34 years. For every 100 females, there were 90.9 males. For every 100 females age 18 and over, there were 84.3 males.

The median household income was $48,765 and the median family income  was $55,559. Males had a median income of $44,605 versus $31,727 for females. The per capita income for the CDP was $20,816. About 9.8% of families and 10.4% of the population were below the poverty line, including 16.5% of those under age 18 and 8.9% of those age 65 or over.

References

Census-designated places in Montgomery County, Pennsylvania
Census-designated places in Pennsylvania